A Closed Game (or Double Queen's Pawn Opening) is a chess opening that begins with the moves:
1. d4 d5
This slight difference has a tremendous effect on the opening. For instance, whereas the King's Gambit is rarely played today at the highest levels of chess, the Queen's Gambit remains popular at all levels of play. Also, compared with the king's pawn openings, transpositions between variations are more common and important in the closed games.

Specific openings

The Richter–Veresov Attack, Colle System, Stonewall Attack, Torre Attack, London System, and Blackmar–Diemer Gambit are classified as Queen's Pawn Games because White plays d4 but not c4. The Richter–Veresov is rarely played at the top levels of chess. The Colle and London are both , rather than specific opening variations. White develops aiming for a particular formation without great concern over how Black chooses to defend. Both these systems are popular with club players because they are easy to learn, but are rarely used by professionals because a well prepared opponent playing Black can equalize fairly easily. The Blackmar–Diemer Gambit is an attempt by White to open lines and obtain attacking chances. Most professionals consider it too risky for serious games, but it is popular with amateurs and in blitz chess.

The most important closed openings are in the Queen's Gambit family (White plays 2.c4).
The Queen's Gambit is somewhat misnamed, since White can always regain the offered pawn if desired.
In the Queen's Gambit Accepted, Black plays ...dxc4, giving up the center for free development and the chance to try to give White an isolated queen pawn with a subsequent ...c5 and ...cxd4. White will get active pieces and possibilities for the attack. Black has two popular ways to decline the pawn, the Slav (2...c6) and the Queen's Gambit Declined (2...e6). Both of these moves lead to an immense forest of variations that can require a great deal of opening study to play well. Among the many possibilities in the Queen's Gambit Declined are the Orthodox Defense, Lasker Defense, the Cambridge Springs Defense, the Tartakower Variation, and the Tarrasch and Semi-Tarrasch Defenses.

Black replies to the Queen's Gambit other than 2...dxc4, 2...c6, and 2...e6 are uncommon. The Chigorin Defense (2...Nc6) is playable but rare.
The Symmetrical Defense (2...c5) is the most direct challenge to Queen's Gambit theory—Can Black equalize by simply copying White's moves? Most opening theoreticians believe not, and consequently the Symmetrical Defense is not popular. The Baltic Defense (2...Bf5) takes the most direct solution to solving the problem of Black's queen bishop by developing it on the second move. Although it is not trusted by most elite players, it has not been refuted and some very strong grandmasters have played it. The Albin Countergambit (2...e5) is generally considered too risky for top-level tournament play. Similarly, the Marshall Defense (2...Nf6) is very rarely seen in grandmaster play, as most theoreticians consider it definitely inferior for Black.

Diagrams

See also 
Open Game (1.e4 e5)
Semi-Open Game (1.e4 moves other than 1...e5)
Semi-Closed Game (1.d4 moves other than 1...d5)
Flank opening (1.c4, 1.Nf3, 1.f4, and others)
Irregular chess opening

References

 

Closed Game
Chess terminology